The Mulwala Canal is an irrigation canal in the southern Riverina region of New South Wales, Australia. It is the largest irrigation canal in the Southern Hemisphere. The canal, starting at Lake Mulwala, diverts water from the Murray River across the southern Riverina plain to the Edward River at Deniliquin. The canal is 156 km long.

The canal was constructed between 1935 and 1942.

As well as water for agriculture, the canal also provides water for the southern Riverina towns of Berrigan, Finley, Bunnaloo and Wakool.

Pacific Hydro operate The Drop Hydro hydroelectric power station on the canal, near Berrigan. The power station, with a generating capacity of 2.5 MW of electricity, is Australia's first hydroelectric power station on an irrigation canal.

See also
 Canals in Australia

References

External links

Murray Irrigation Limited — the operator of the canal

Irrigation in Australia
Murray River
Rivers in the Riverina
Canals in Australia
Canals opened in 1942
1942 establishments in Australia